John Murphy was a politician in Queensland, Australia. He was a Member of the Queensland Legislative Assembly.

He was the member for Ipswich 18 June 1867 to 12 August 1870.

Early life 
He was born 25 September 1820 (County Cork, Ireland)  to Daniel Jervois and Susan (née Godson).

Family life 
He had 4 sons and 2 daughters.

Religion 
He was a member of the Church of England.

Career 
He began his career by working in a lawyer's office in Sydney before becoming a storekeeper's assistant at Muswellbrook. He arrived in Ipswich in 1852 and became manager of mercantile firm. He then became a forwarding and commission agent then became the first Mayor of Ipswich from 1860 to 1861 and served as mayor again from 1865 to 1867. On 11 September 1861 he recommended that the council have a seal. The design is still used today.  He represented Ipswich in the Legislative Assembly of Queensland, 19 June 1867 to 12 August 1870. He was  appointed police magistrate at Goondiwindi in 1872 and then at Roma in 1874.

References

Members of the Queensland Legislative Assembly
1820 births
1883 deaths
19th-century Australian politicians
Irish emigrants to colonial Australia